Tamer El-Sawy , born 11 February 1972) is a retired Egyptian tennis player.

El-Sawy represented his country in the Davis Cup as his premier tournament at the age of 16. His first first-place finish for a collegiate tournament was the LSU Fall Showcase in 1992. His later career, in just a few years, would leave him as the top-seeded player for the Milwaukee Tennis Classic. His highest ATP ranking was 128 (from 10 February 1997) and his highest USTA ranking was 117 in 1995.

References

1972 births
Living people
Egyptian expatriates in the United States
Egyptian male tennis players
LSU Tigers tennis players
Sportspeople from Cairo
African Games medalists in tennis
African Games bronze medalists for Egypt
Competitors at the 1995 All-Africa Games